Igor Jesus Lima (born on 7 March 2003), known as Igor Jesus, is a Brazilian footballer who plays as a defensive midfielder for Flamengo.

Career
Igor Jesus made his debut on 26 January 2022, starting for Flamengo in the Campeonato Carioca 2–1 home win against Portuguesa da Ilha.

Career statistics

References

External links

2003 births
Living people
Brazilian footballers
Association football midfielders
Campeonato Brasileiro Série A players
CR Flamengo footballers